Kerens is an unincorporated community in Randolph County, West Virginia, United States. Kerens has a post office with ZIP code 26276.

The community was named in honor of Richard C. Kerens, a railroad official.

References

Unincorporated communities in Randolph County, West Virginia
Unincorporated communities in West Virginia